The Roman amphitheatre of Italica is a ruined Roman amphitheatre situated in the Roman settlement of Italica, present-day Santiponce, in Andalusia, Spain.

It was built during the reign of emperor Hadrian, approximately between the years 117 and 138, and was one of the largest in the entire Roman Empire.

Architectural features 
The amphitheatre had capacity of 25,000 spectators. It has an elliptical shape, with a major axis of 160 metres (525 ft) and one less than 137 metres (449 ft), it had three levels of stands. Under the level of the old wooden floor of the amphitheater there was a service pit for the different gladiatorial shows, called munus gladiatorum and fights against wild beasts, called venatio.

The cavea was divided into three sections, the ima, media and summa cavea, separated by annular corridors called praecinctions. The first, the ima cavea, had 6 stands, with 8 access doors, and was reserved for a ruling class. The second, the media cavea, was intended for the humblest population, had 12 tiers and 14 access doors. The summa cavea, covered by an awning, was reserved only to children and women.

The amphitheatre also had several rooms dedicated to the cult of Nemesis and Juno.

Popular culture
The amphitheatre of Italica was used in seasons seven and eight of Game of Thrones as the Dragonpit of King's Landing.

See also 
 List of Roman amphitheatres
 List of Roman sites in Spain

References

External links 

 
 Official website of the Town council of Santiponce

Roman amphitheatres in Spain
Buildings and structures in the Province of Seville

History of Andalusia
Buildings and structures completed in the 2nd century